The following is a partial list of German ambassadors to Morocco since 1957.

List

Federal Republic of Germany (1949–present) 
 1956–1957: None
 1957–1960: Hansjoachim von der Esch
 1960–1962: Herbert Müller-Roschach
 1962–1965: Walther Hess
 1965–1970: Heinz Voigt
 1970–1975: Heinrich Hendus
 1975–1978: Hans Schwarzmann
 1978–1984: Walter Jesser
 1984–1990: Norbert Montfort
 1990–1994: Murad Wilfred Hofmann
 1994–1999: Herwig Bartels
 1999–2002: Hans-Dieter Scheel
 2002–2005: Roland Mauch
 2005–2008: Gottfried Haas
 2008–2011: Ulf-Dieter Klemm
 2011–2014: Michael Witter
 2014–2017: Volkmar Wenzel
 2017–2021: Götz Schmidt-Bremme
 2021–present: Thomas Zahneisen; Agrément pending

Morocco
 
Germany